"My Guy" is a 1964 hit single by Mary Wells for the Motown label. Written and produced by Smokey Robinson of The Miracles, the song is a woman's rejection of a sexual advance and affirmation of her fidelity to her boyfriend, who is her ideal and with whom she is happy, despite his ordinary physique and looks.

Mary Wells version
At the session for the "My Guy" backing track, the studio musicians were having issues completing the intro: with the musicians having been playing all day and a half-hour scheduled studio time left, trombonist George Bohanon said to keyboardist Earl Van Dyke that the opening measure of "Canadian Sunset" could be perfectly juxtaposed on the intro's chord changes, and Van Dyke, the session bandleader, expediently constructed an intro incorporating the opening of "Canadian Sunset" and also the "left hand notes" from "Canadian Sunset" composer Eddie Heywood's rendition of "Begin the Beguine". Van Dyke would recall: "We were doing anything to get the hell out of that studio. We knew that the producers didn't know nothing 'bout no 'Canadian Sunset' or 'Begin the Beguine'. We figured the song would wind up in the trash can anyway".

When Wells recorded her vocal she sang over the song's outro with a huskiness evoking the line delivery of Mae West: Wells would recall: "I was only joking but the producers said 'Keep it going, keep it going'."

Cash Box described it as "a tantalizing shuffle-twist hand-clapper that the lark and her combo-choral support serve up in most attractive fashion."

"My Guy" became the biggest hit ever for Wells, Motown's first female star, and reached the top of the Billboard Hot 100 pop singles chart on 16 May 1964. The song led the Cashbox magazine R&B chart for seven weeks.  "My Guy" was also Wells' last hit single for Motown, except for duets she recorded with label mate Marvin Gaye. An option in her recording contract let Wells terminate the contract at her discretion after she reached her twenty-first birthday on May 13, 1964. Encouraged by her ex-husband, Wells broke her Motown contract and signed with 20th Century Fox in hopes of higher royalties and possible movie roles. However, Wells' career never again reached the heights it had at Motown, and she never again had a hit single as big as "My Guy".

Her version of the song was used in the film More American Graffiti (1979) and in a season one episode of Friends ("The One with Mrs. Bing"). 

In the United Kingdom, "My Guy" peaked at number five in June 1964.

Charts

Weekly charts

Year-end charts

Certifications

Personnel
 Lead vocals by Mary Wells
 Background vocals by the Andantes: Jackie Hicks, Marlene Barrow, and Louvain Demps
 Written and produced by William "Smokey" Robinson
 Instrumentation by the Funk Brothers:
Earl Van Dyke – keyboards 
Johnny Griffith – piano
Eddie Willis – guitar
Robert White – guitar
James Jamerson – bass
Benny Benjamin – drums
Dave Hamilton – vibes
Herbert Williams – trumpet
John Wilson – trumpet
Paul Riser – trombone
George Bohanon – trombone

Other versions

"My Guy" has three times returned to the Billboard Hot 100; first as rendered by Petula Clark whose rendition featured on her 1971 album Now peaked at #70 crossing over from the Easy Listening chart where it reached #12. In 1980, Amii Stewart and Johnny Bristol recorded a medley of "My Guy" and another Motown classic, the Temptations' "My Girl": "My Guy - My Girl (Medley)" peaked at #63 in the U.S., #76 R&B, and #39 in the UK. The track was reissued in 1985 with Bristol's vocal being replaced by Deon Estus: this version reached #63 in the UK. Sister Sledge remade "My Guy" for their 1982 self-produced album The Sisters: Kathy Sledge, the group's usual lead singer, would recall - "I had very little input [into the album], but I did push for 'My Guy'." Issued as the album's lead single, "My Guy" afforded Sister Sledge their third Top 40 hit although with a #23 peak its chart impact was well below that of the group's precedent hits "He's the Greatest Dancer" and "We Are Family" (both 1979), which had respective chart peaks of #9 and #2. "My Guy" also afforded Sister Sledge a fifth and final Top 20 R&B hit on the R&B chart, peaking at #14. The Sister Sledge version of "My Guy" had its strongest impact on the Easy Listening chart where it rose as high as #2. Sister Sledge performed "My Guy" on the episode of the CBS-TV sitcom The Jeffersons entitled "My Guy, George", taped 17 January 1984 and broadcast 4 March 1984. In the guise of struggling musical act the Satin Sisters, Sister Sledge wooed George Jefferson to act as their manager by singing him an a cappella rendition of "My Guy" with the lyrics modified to flatter Jefferson.

"My Guy" has twice reached the C&W chart in renderings by Lynda K Lance (#46 C&W, 1971) and by Margo Smith (#43 C&W, 1980).

The song has also been recorded by Lucia Altieri (it) (rendered in Italian as "Non ti scuso piu"), Aretha Franklin, Nancy Holloway (fr) (rendered in French as "Bye Bye"), Claudine Longet, Barbara McNair, Melba Moore, Dara Sedaka, and Helen Shapiro. Mary Wells herself re-recorded the song in a funk rendition for her 1984 album, I'm a Lady.

More than via any straightforward remake, "My Guy" has had its highest profile since the Mary Wells original through its appearance on the soundtrack of the film Sister Act (1992), starring Whoopi Goldberg, in a rendition that substitutes "My Guy" with "My God", transforming the song into a gospel number.

In 1999, "My Guy" was inducted into the Grammy Hall of Fame.

In 2008, the Los Angeles-based rock group Warpaint performed a version of the song on their EP Exquisite Corpse, titled "Billie Holliday".

References

1964 songs
1964 singles
1972 singles
1982 singles
Mary Wells songs
Margo Smith songs
Sister Sledge songs
Petula Clark songs
Billboard Hot 100 number-one singles
Cashbox number-one singles
Number-one singles in Australia
Number-one singles in New Zealand
Grammy Hall of Fame Award recipients
Songs written by Smokey Robinson
Helen Shapiro songs
Motown singles
MGM Records singles
Cotillion Records singles
Song recordings produced by Smokey Robinson